Kurin is a term for various Ukrainian military units.

Kurin may also refer to:

Kurin, Syria, a village in Syria
Kurin District, a district in Iran

As a surname
Richard Kurin, an American cultural anthropologist